Pete Herrmann (born August 27, 1948) is an American retired basketball coach. He served as the head basketball coach at the United States Naval Academy from 1986 to 1992 and Young Harris College from 2010 to 2018. He was also the interim head men's basketball coach at the University of Georgia for the final 12 games of the 2008–09 season following the firing of Dennis Felton.  Herrmann restarted the basketball program at Young Harris in 2010–11 after a 40-year hiatus.   At Navy he coached future National Basketball Association (NBA) All-Star and Olympian David Robinson.

Personal life
Herrmann graduated from the State University of New York at Geneseo in 1970. Herrmann and his wife, Sharon, reside in Young Harris, Georgia.

Head coaching record

References

1948 births
Living people
American men's basketball coaches
Georgia Bulldogs basketball coaches
High school basketball coaches in the United States
Hobart Statesmen basketball coaches
Kansas State Wildcats men's basketball coaches
Navy Midshipmen men's basketball coaches
State University of New York at Geneseo alumni
Virginia Cavaliers men's basketball coaches
Western Kentucky Hilltoppers basketball coaches
Young Harris Mountain Lions men's basketball coaches